Ole Holm (28 December 1870 – 29 January 1956) was a Norwegian rifle shooter. He was born in Stange. He won a silver medal in free rifle team at the 1906 Summer Olympics in Athens, together with Gudbrand Skatteboe, Julius Braathe, Albert Helgerud and John Møller.

References

1870 births
1956 deaths
People from Stange
Norwegian male sport shooters
Shooters at the 1906 Intercalated Games
Medalists at the 1906 Intercalated Games
Olympic silver medalists for Norway
Sportspeople from Innlandet
20th-century Norwegian people